HLO may refer to:

 Halloki Halt railway station, in Pakistan
 Health Licensing Office of the Oregon Public Health Division
 Heiloo railway station, in the Netherlands
 Helicopter landing officer
 Australian Stock Exchange code for Helloworld Travel Ltd
 High level outline, a tem for High-level design
 Homeless liaison officer